Affection (translit. Obich) is a 1972 Bulgarian drama film directed by Ludmil Staikov. It was entered into the 8th Moscow International Film Festival where it won the Golden Prize.

Cast
 Violeta Doneva as Maria
 Nevena Kokanova as Irina
 Stefan Danailov as Nikolay
 Banko Bankov as Petrov, zhurnalist
 Nikolai Binev as Upravitelyat
 Ivan Kondov as Bashtata
 Katya Dineva as Maykata
 Andrey Chaprazov as Arhitekt Stanimirov
 Svetozar Nedelchev as Manasiev
 Anton Karastojanow as Kostov
 Vasil Popiliev as Nelegalniyat
 Dobri Dobrew as Lekaryat
 Lidiya Aleksandrova as Meditzinskata sestra

References

External links
 

1972 films
1972 drama films
Bulgarian drama films
1970s Bulgarian-language films
Films directed by Ludmil Staikov